Anna Tambour is an author of satire, fable and other strange and hard-to-categorize fiction and poetry.

Her novel Crandolin was shortlisted for the 2013 World Fantasy Award. Tambour's collection Monterra's Deliciosa & Other Tales & was published in 2003, and Spotted Lily, a novel, in 2005. Ebook editions of both of these were published by infinity plus in 2011.

Reviews
Locus listed both Tambour's collections and both novels in their Recommended Reading lists. Her 2015 collection The Finest Ass in the Universe was shortlisted for an Aurealis Award for Best Collection. Spotted Lily was shortlisted in 2006 for the William L. Crawford Fantasy Award, and was recommended for a British Fantasy Society Award (Best Novel). In 2008, The Jeweller of Second-hand Roe won the Aurealis Award for best horror short story.

Tambour lives in the Australian bush, but has lived all over the world and is, in Tambour's words, "of no fixed nationality". In addition to writing fiction, Tambour also writes about and takes photographs of what she calls " — magnificent insignificants".

Bibliography
 "The Age of Fish, Post-Flowers" in Out of the Ruins, edited by Preston Grassman, Titan Books, 2021, 
 The Road to Neozon. Obsidian Sky Books, Detroit, MI, USA, 2018, 
 Smoke, Paper, Mirrors. Infinity Plus, UK: 2017, 
 The Finest Ass in the Universe. Ticonderoga Publications, Greenwood, WA, Australia, 2015,  
 Crandolin
 Crandolin. Ebook. Cheeky Frawg Books, Tallahassee, FL, USA, 2016, ASIN B01B264SNK 
 Crandolin. Chomu Press, UK: 2012, 987-1-907681-19-6
 Monterra's Deliciosa & Other Tales &
 Monterra's Deliciosa & Other Tales &. Canton, OH: Prime, 2003, 
 Monterra's Deliciosa & Other Tales &. Ebook. Wivenhoe, UK: infinity plus ebooks, 2011, ASIN B004JKNQJ4
 Spotted Lily
 Spotted Lily. Canton, OH: Wildside, 2005, 
 Spotted Lily. Ebook. Wivenhoe, UK: infinity plus ebooks, 2011, ASIN B004JKNQK8

References

External links
Anna Tambour Official website
Anna Tambour's blog Medlar Comfits

Women satirists
Women food writers
Women science writers
Nature writers
Australian fantasy writers
Australian women novelists
Australian women short story writers
Living people
Australian women poets
Fabulists
Women science fiction and fantasy writers
Year of birth missing (living people)